Hammam Yalbugha is a Mamluk-era public bath ("hammam") in Aleppo, Syria.  It was built in 1491 by the Emir of Aleppo Saif ad-Din Yalbugha al-Naseri. It is located next to the entrance of the Citadel of Aleppo, on the banks of the Quweiq river.

The Hammam Yalbugha was damaged during the Syrian war.

Interior (in 2001)

References

See also
Hammam Yalbugha al-Nasiri, archnet
Yalbugha Baths Restoration, archnet

Public baths in the Arab world
Buildings and structures in Aleppo
Buildings and structures completed in 1491
15th-century establishments in the Mamluk Sultanate